Stanvac may refer to:

 Port Stanvac, South Australia
 Standard Vacuum Oil Company